is a headland located in southern Kii Peninsula in the Kansai Region of Japan. It is located within the borders of the town of Kushimoto in Wakayama Prefecture, and is the most southerly point of the island of Honshu, and Wakayama Prefecture. Much of the cape is also a part of the Yoshino-Kumano National Park. The area is subject to frequent typhoons and the cape is often used as an indicator of the location of typhoons relative to Japan.

Geologically, the cape is a flat uplifted seafood plateau with an elevation of 60 to 80 meters consisting of two marine terraces, and a coastal cliff with a height of 40 meters. Originally an island, gravel from the estuary of nearby rivers is carried by coastal currents to form a sandbar, which now connects the island to land.

Cape Shionomisaki is the location of the Shionomisaki Lighthouse, one of the “50 Lighthouses of Japan” by the Japan Lighthouse Association.

Climate

Gallery

References

External links

Kushimoto Tourist Information

Shionomisaki
Landforms of Wakayama Prefecture
Extreme points of Japan
Kushimoto, Wakayama